Christinehof Castle is a manor house in Tomelilla Municipality, Scania, Sweden.

History
The first estate mentioned on the site was situated in the 14th-century, and named Sjöstrup, according to tradition owned by a German noble named Snakenborg. In 1387, the estates Kolstrup and Sjöstrup was united to the estate Andrarum, which was bought in 1725 by  Christina Piper  (1673–1752), widow of Carl Piper (1647–1716), head of the field chancellery under King Carl XII .
The present castle was built in 1737-40 by Christina Piper  and named Christinehof after her. It was built in the German Baroque style.

See also
List of castles in Sweden

References

External links

 Christinehof Ecopark
 Christinehof Castle

Castles in Skåne County
18th-century establishments in Skåne County